Coryphellina delicata is a species of sea slug, an aeolid nudibranch, a marine gastropod mollusc in the family Flabellinidae.

Distribution
This species was described from Madang, Papua New Guinea with additional material from Aliwal Shoals, Natal, South Africa. It has also been reported from Indonesia and Japan and is probably a widespread species in the Indo-Pacific region.

References

Flabellinidae
Gastropods described in 1991